Amberley Publishing are a firm of publishers in Stroud, Gloucestershire, who specialise in non-fiction transport and history books. They were established in 2008 and the chief executive is Nick Hayward who previously worked at AudioGo and Simon and Schuster.

The firm has a catalogue of around 3,000 titles including the "Through Time" series of colour local history books.

In 2016 it was announced that Amberley had partnered with Yad Vashem Publications to publish titles about the Holocaust in the United Kingdom. In 2018, they published Women's Experiences in the Holocaust by Agnes Grunwald-Spier which was launched at the Wiener Library for the Study of the Holocaust and Genocide.

The firm are the sponsors of the National History Book Competition.

References

External links 
Official website

Publishing companies of the United Kingdom
Companies based in Stroud, Gloucestershire
Publishing companies established in 2008
2008 establishments in England